Judy Canty (5 October 1931 – 9 July 2016) was an Australian athlete who competed in the 1948 Summer Olympics in the Long Jump, aged just 16 she finished 7th.

References

1931 births
2016 deaths
Athletes (track and field) at the 1948 Summer Olympics
Olympic athletes of Australia
Australian female long jumpers
Commonwealth Games medallists in athletics
Commonwealth Games silver medallists for Australia
Athletes (track and field) at the 1950 British Empire Games
20th-century Australian women
21st-century Australian women
Medallists at the 1950 British Empire Games